Engelbert-von-Berg-Gymnasium Wipperfürth (EvB) is a gymnasium (secondary school) in Wipperfürth, Germany.

The school in its modern form began in 1830.

Notable alumni
 Afu Thomas - Social media figure in China

References

Further reading

External links

 Engelbert-von-Berg-Gymnasium Wipperfürth 

Gymnasiums in Germany
Oberbergischer Kreis
1830 establishments in Germany
Educational institutions established in 1830